All Alone is a solo piano album by Dolo Coker which was recorded in 1979 and released on the Xanadu label in 1981.

Reception

AllMusic reviewer Scott Yanow states, "Dolo Coker's fourth and final album as a leader is a set of unaccompanied piano solos with the emphasis on reflective ballads (although there are also a couple of swinging tunes)".

Track listing 
All compositions by Dolo Coker except as indicated
 "Reflections" - 5:54  
 "Sine and Cosine" - 2:15  
 "Just You" - 4:36  
 "Cabin in the Sky" (Vernon Duke, John La Touche) - 5:38  
 "All Alone" - 4:12  
 "The Things You Never Said" - 4:59  
 "Spectrum" - 3:24  
 "Try a Little Tenderness" (Jimmy Campbell, Reg Connelly, Harry M. Woods) - 5:53

Personnel 
Dolo Coker - piano

References 

Dolo Coker albums
1981 albums
Xanadu Records albums
Albums produced by Don Schlitten
Solo piano jazz albums